Temple Law Review is a student-edited law review, sponsored by the Temple University Beasley School of Law. The journal is "dedicated to providing a forum for the expression of new legal thought and scholarly commentary on important developments, trends, and issues in the law." Publishing continuously since 1927, Temple Law Review is one of three student journals at Temple University Beasley School of Law. Four issues are printed each year, with the Summer issue traditionally focusing on scholarly materials presented during that year's Symposium. Temple Law Review also publishes Temple Law Review Online, a supplement for "scholarly works that are shorter than the traditional law review article, involve time-sensitive topics, or directly respond to materials published in Temple Law Review's printed issues."

History 
The journal was founded in 1927 as the Temple Law Quarterly. In its earliest years, the journal covered a wide variety of legal topics, including constitutional law, international law, and legal ethics, with articles and case notes contributed by both students and practicing lawyers. Temple Law Quarterly scrutinized many twentieth-century developments, publishing articles on patent law's approach to chemical compounds, the consequences of the two World Wars on civil rights and insurance liabilities, the rise of medical malpractice law, and racial discrimination in Pennsylvania Bar admissions. The journal published sixty volumes under the name Temple Law Quarterly, before being renamed the Temple Law Review in 1988.

Notable Temple Law Review Articles 
  
 
 
 
 
 
 
 
 Robert J. Reinstein, Completing the Constitution, 66  361 (1993).

Notable Temple Law Quarterly Articles 

 Chief Justice William H. Rehnquist, The Courts and the Constitution, 60  829 (1987).
 The Philadelphia Special Investigation Commission: The Findings, Conclusions, and Recommendations of the Philadelphia Special Investigation Commission, 59  339 (1986).
 The Report of the Philadelphia Bar Association Special Committee on Pennsylvania Bar Admission Procedures - Racial Discrimination in Administration of the Pennsylvania Bar Examination, 44  (1971).
 Honorable Robert H. Jackson, et al., Agreement for the Establishment of an International Military Tribunal, 19  160 (1946); Charter of the International Military Tribunal, 19  162 (1946); Indictment Against Major Nazi War Criminals, 19  172 (1946).
 Francis Chapman, Lincoln the Lawyer, 9  277 (1935).

Further reading 
 Henry S. Borneman, The Origin and the First Seven Years of the Temple University School of Law, 27  402 (1954).
 John M. Lindsey & Janet Blom Shea, eds., Temple University School of Law Centennial 1895-1995 (Special Centennial Edition),  Nov. 1995.

References

American law journals
General law journals
Temple University
Publications established in 1927
English-language journals
Law journals edited by students
Quarterly journals